The Gypsy is a 1992 urban fantasy novel written by Megan Lindholm and Steven Brust. It blends elements of Hungarian folk tales with a modern-day detective story. The book contains many lyrics to songs that were later recorded by Minnesota Celtic-punk band Boiled in Lead for their album Songs from The Gypsy.

Editions and translations 
The first edition was a hardcover issued by Tor Books in July 1992. At least two softcover editions have been issued since: a mass-market paperback by Tor Books in July 1993 and a trade paperback edition by Orb Books in April 2005. 
A French translation, La nuit du prédateur, was published by Mnémos in April 2006.

Songs from The Gypsy

Songs from The Gypsy is an album by Boiled in Lead. The songs were later incorporated into the novel The Gypsy, despite the date of the recording. The album was released on June 21, 1995, in a special enhanced CD format that included the whole text of the book and extra features such as sound clips.

Track listing
    	Raven, Owl, and I (3:17)  
    	Leanan Sidhe (3:48) 
    	Hide My Track (4:04)  
    	No Passenger (1:59)  
    	Back In Town (3:38)  
    	Ugros (Springtime) (6:17)  
    	The Gypsy (8:08)
    	Blackened Page (4:56)  
    	The Fair Lady (3:05)  
    	Red Lights and Neon (4:13)

External links
 
 

1992 American novels
American fantasy novels
Tor Books books
Novels by Steven Brust